Tin Wan Shan is a hill in southern Hong Kong.

Geography
The entire mountain is located inside Aberdeen Country Park.

See also
 List of mountains, peaks and hills in Hong Kong

References

Mountains, peaks and hills of Hong Kong